He Yingqin, (April 2, 1890 – October 21, 1987) also Ho Ying-chin, was a politician and one of the most senior generals of the Kuomintang (KMT) during Republic of China, and a close ally of Chiang Kai-shek.

Early years

A native of Guizhou, He was healthy and bookish in his childhood. In 1907, he was enrolled in the Guiyang Military Elementary School, and transferred to the more famous Wuchang Third Army Middle School in the following year. In the same year, He was chosen by the Defense Department of Qing Dynasty to study in Japan in the 11th class of Tokyo Shimbu Gakko; a military preparatory academy.

When studying in Japan, he became acquainted with fellow student Chiang Kai-shek. He learned military skills and was influenced by the anti-Qing Dynasty theories of the Tongmenghui, which he soon joined. In 1911 after the outbreak of Wuchang Uprising, He came back to China with other members of Tongmenghui to work for Chen Qimei, who was governor of Shanghai, and also known as Chiang's mentor. When the war waged by the Tongmenghui against Yuan Shikai failed, he was forced to take refuge in Japan. After, he continued his military training at the Imperial Japanese Army Academy. His classmate at the time included Zhu Shaoliang.

After his graduation in 1916, Liu Xianshi, the governor of Guizhou, planned to set up a military academy in Guizhou to train troops for himself. Liu asked his son, who also had studied in Japan, to enroll some talented individuals for this job. With the recommendation of Liu's son and Wang Wenhua, the commander of the Guizhou Army, He Yingqin was appointed as colonel of 4th Regiment of Guizhou Army.

He won Wang's trust quickly and later, even married Wang's sister. In the power struggle between Liu and Wang, He supported Wang, consequently Liu lost power in 1920. As a reward, He was appointed as president of academy, head of police, and brigadier of the 5th Brigade of Guizhou Army. When Wang was assassinated by his rivals in 1921, the troops of Wang fell into chaos and civil strife. He was expelled from Guizhou by other generals and went to Yunnan to work for a local warlord.

Rise and fall in the Kuomintang

In 1924, Chiang Kai-shek made preparation for the establishment of Whampoa Military Academy under the authorization of Sun Yat-sen. Chiang knew of his alleged military talent and recommended that Sun appoint him as General Instructor of the academy. Sun sent a telegraph to Guangzhou asking if he would personally to accept the offer.

In the course of the academy's establishment, He supported Chiang and won Chiang's appreciation. In the war against the local warlord Chen Jiongming, students training in the academy were grouped into two regiments, with He as a colonel of one of the regiments. In the war, he proved his courage and military talent by winning several battles although he had just recovered from an illness, and his performance made a deep impression on both Chiang and the Soviet Union's military advisor Vasily Blyukher (General Galen). Galen sent his sword to He as a gift after this war.

In July of the same year, the National Revolutionary Army was established. The students of the Whampoa Military Academy were grouped into the 1st Army Corps, with Chiang as the supreme commander, and He Yingqin as commander of one division, with Zhou Enlai as the party representative of He's division. In September, Chen Jiongming masterminded another commotion. Chiang led the war to put down this revolt, in which He demonstrated his military talent again.

During the Northern Expedition in 1926, He Yingqin succeeded Chiang as commander of the 1st Army Corps and led his army marching into Guangdong and Fujian provinces.  After He controlled the whole area of Fujian, he conquered Zhejiang as well. When Chiang began to confront the Communists He continued to support Chiang. In 1927 He supported the Shanghai massacre of 1927 in which General Bai Chongxi’s Eastern Route Army launched a massacre on Communist Party members in Shanghai, ending first KMT-CCP alliance.

When Chiang seized power, the tension arose with Wang Jingwei and the New Guangxi Clique led by Li Zongren and Bai Chongxi, who made public statements that Chiang should resign. Under these circumstances, He thought Chiang had made himself a public enemy and was destined to fail, so he lent secret support to Chiang's opponents. In the meeting to decide Chiang's future, when Bai asked Chiang to resign, Chiang turned to He for support, but He remained silent. Chiang was forced to resign.

However, as Wang and his allies soon proved incompetent in controlling the situation, Chiang soon regained power. One of his first actions was to relieve He of his military command. He went to Hangzhou in protest, and during a meeting with Chiang, Chiang told He, "Without you, I can still take power, but without me, you will be nothing."  After careful consideration, He had to reconcile with Chiang.

He was appointed chief of staff and training supervisor of the National Revolutionary Army. During his term, he spared no effort to train armies for Chiang and crack down on warlords by regrouping their armies into Chiang's own armies. During the war between Chiang and alliance of the New Guangxi Clique, Yan Xishan, Feng Yuxiang, He commanded the army even after receiving word that his father had died, impressing Chiang with his dedication. During this time, he began to attend Catholic mass at his wife's urging and eventually embraced his wife's faith. This conversion came perhaps as a result of his despondency over his break with Chiang and loss of his position as army commander. Later in life, he would play a more active role as a Christian, becoming known as China's most prominent lay Catholic and a prominent supporter of the Moral Re-Armament movement.

In 1930, He was appointed as Minister of Military Administration Department of the Nationalist (KMT) government, a post which he held for over a decade. During his term, he made great contributions to military service, logistics, defense construction of KMT, and his probity and cleanness won him prestige and enhanced his reputation.

In 1931, He was appointed as commander to lead Second Encirclement Campaign against Jiangxi Soviet, but his troops suffered great losses, which was the beginning of the end of his reputation as a skillful commander.

In the same year, the September 18 Incident provided for the Japanese a pretext of invading China. Chiang regarded the Chinese Communist Party (CCP) as his archrival and placed priority on the suppression of CCP forces, rather than the Japanese.  Chiang thus ordered He to Northern China to negotiate compromises with the Japanese, as he was known to be on friendly terms with some of their leaders. In 1933, Japanese armies invaded Rehe and broke through the KMT defense along the Great Wall. He Yingqin replaced Zhang Xueliang as chairman of the Beijing Military Committee, which was the supreme organ in charge of the military forces of Northern China. He advocated no direct confrontation with the Japanese troops, and signed the Tanggu Cease-Fire Accord with General Yasuji Okamura, who was deputy chief of staff of Kantogun at that time.

After that, in an effort to prevent further conflict with Japan, He Yingqin opposed military action against the Japanese, and disarmed Feng Yuxiang's anti-Japanese army. However, when the Blue Shirts Society (BSS), the secret organization of the Whampoa Clique of the KMT, and a firm anti-Japanese group fought back with assassination and other violent activities in 1935, the Japanese argued that it was violation of the Tanggu Truce. Japanese General Yoshijirō Umezu, who was commander of Japanese troops in Northern China at that time provided He with proof of the BSS activities which had been gathered by the Japanese spy-master Kenji Doihara, and He was forced to sign the He-Umezu Agreement which required that all forces having relations with the BSS inclusive of military police, including KMT regular forces such as 2nd Division and 25th Division be evacuated from Beijing and out of Hebei province.

With both KMT regular and BSS irregular forces out of Northern China, He Yingqin had little room for maneuver with the Japanese. He returned to Nanjing to resume his job as minister. In December 1936, during the Xi'an Incident, Chiang was taken into custody by Zhang Xueliang's army. There were disagreements among the KMT leaders on how to handle this situation. Chiang's wife Soong Mei-ling was afraid of Chiang being killed and urged peace negotiations. However, He strongly supported the need to solve this incident by force and was voted as acting commander to lead the KMT armies to the rescue of Chiang with the support of young and extremist officers of the BSS. He also contacted Wang Jingwei and asked him back to China to take charge of the KMT, and sent two armies marching to Xi'an to fight against Zhang's army. Soong went to Xi'an in person for peace talks and succeeded in rescuing Chiang. When Chiang came back, he distrusted He again. Nonetheless, He kept his position as minister but with little real power.

With the start of the Second Sino-Japanese War after the Marco Polo Bridge Incident in 1937, He Yingqin was appointed as chief of staff and worked with Chiang for drafting military plans. In 1944, when his title of Minister of War was taken over by Chiang's favorite, Chen Cheng, He was appointed as General Commander of the Chinese Military Area, which was an honorable title instead of real power, and was sent to Yunnan to train the Chinese Expeditionary Army, which was set up under the proposal of Joseph Stilwell, for assisting in Allied operations in Southeast Asia.   During WW2, General He also participated in the secret Allied meetings in India, with generals and leaders from France, United Kingdom and USA.   

With the defeat of Japan in August 1945, He was appointed as representative of both the Chinese Government and the Southeast Asia Allied Forces at the September 9th ceremony in Nanjing to accept the statement of surrender submitted by General Yasuji Okamura, who was Commander of Japanese troops in China at that time. host the surrender of Japanese troops in China.  This historic moment put He under the spotlight of the world, and was the peak of his career.

In 1946, the KMT government set up the Defense Department to take charge of military operations against CCP forces in the Chinese Civil War, but He lost to Chen Cheng and Bai, who were appointed as Chief of Staff and Defense Minister respectively.  He was sent instead to the United Nations Security Council as director of the Chinese military delegation. One year later, He was called back to be a senior military advisor, and regained the position of Defense Minister in 1948, in time to witness the collapse of KMT power.

In 1949, Chiang had to resign for the third time, when Li Zongren was voted as acting president. In order to contain Li's power and influence, Chiang asked He to take the job of Speaker and later the head of the Executive Yuan of Li's cabinet, and was also named as acting Defense Minister. He took the job and proposed the plan of cease-fire first and peace negotiations later, for KMT to win time for its governance in China. The Communists exploited the cease fire to cross the Yangtze River and capture Nanjing, the capital of KMT government. Although the KMT still had huge numbers of troops, they were poorly armed and equipped and thus no longer had the combat power to turn the tide, especially after the United States refused to supply any more military aid. In May, He resigned with his cabinet members in Guangzhou.

Later years
When He arrived in Taiwan, he said he would leave politics for introspection of the failure of the KMT. When Chiang was reelected as president of the Republic of China in 1950, He lost his election as member of the central committee of the KMT, and only gained the honorary title of senior advisor.

He took charge of several clubs and associations working for the KMT, and spent most of his time playing sports, bridge, and planting. In 1986 He suffered from apoplexy and was sent to a hospital, where, after several months treatment, he died on October 21, 1987, at the age of 97. With the nickname of "Lucky General", he survived battles and campaigns, and lived longer than most of the patriarchs of KMT inclusive of Chiang. His remains are interred at Wuchih Mountain Military Cemetery in Taiwan.

See also
New 6th Army

References

Dupuy, Trevor N. Harper Encyclopedia of Military Biography, New York, 1992
 http://www.generals.dk/general/Qiu_Qing-quan/_/China.html
Ministry of National Defense R.O.C 
US Naval War College
 https://web.archive.org/web/20090326011824/http://cgsc.leavenworth.army.mil/carl/download/csipubs/bjorge_huai.pdf

1890 births
1987 deaths
Tongmenghui members
People of the 1911 Revolution
People from Qianxinan
Republic of China politicians from Guizhou
Converts to Roman Catholicism
Chinese Roman Catholics
Chinese police officers
Chinese military personnel of World War II
National Revolutionary Army generals from Guizhou
Premiers of the Republic of China
Recipients of the Order of Blue Sky and White Sun
Kuomintang politicians in Taiwan
Defense Ministers of the Republic of China
Chinese anti-communists
Taiwanese people from Guizhou
People of the Northern Expedition